Miloš Vujović (born 5 September 1993) is a Montenegrin handball player for Füchse Berlin and the Montenegrin national team.

Honours

Club
Grundfos Tatabánya KC
Nemzeti Bajnokság I
: 2016, 2017, 2018, 2019
Magyar Kupa
: 2017

Individual
 Nemzeti Bajnokság I Top Scorer: 2019
 All-Star left wing of the European Championship: 2022

Career statistics

References

1993 births
Living people
Montenegrin male handball players
Sportspeople from Cetinje
Expatriate handball players
Montenegrin expatriate sportspeople in Hungary